is one of the eleven wards in the city of Kyoto, in Kyoto Prefecture, Japan. It is located in the northeastern part of the city.

History 
The meaning of sakyō (左京) is "on the Emperor's left." When residing in the Kyoto Imperial Palace the emperor would sit facing south, thus the eastern direction would be to his left. Similarly, there is a ward to the west called Ukyō-ku (右京区), meaning "the ward on the Emperor's right." In old times, sakyō was referring to the eastern part of the capital, but the present Sakyō-ku is bounded to the west by the Kamo River and is thus outside the historical capital.

It was created in 1929 when it was split off from Kamigyō-ku.

Geography 
It is located in the north-east corner of Kyoto city. In the east, it borders the city of Ōtsu in Shiga Prefecture. In the south Sanjō Street separates it from Higashiyama-ku and Yamashina-ku. In the north, it  borders the city of Nantan in Kyoto Prefecture and Takashima in Shiga Prefecture. In central Kyoto, the Kamo River flows on the western border of this ward.

Areas like  have been designated urbanization control areas, where large-scale exploitation and erection of tall buildings is restricted. Many rice fields remain in this area. The northern part of Sakyō-ku is mountainous and has a thriving forest industry.

The large streets ,  and  run from south to north.

Demographics
According to census data, the population of Sakyō-ku has been decreasing since 1980.

Sights 
Famous places located inside Sakyō-ku include Ginkaku-ji, Nanzen-ji, Kamo Shrine, Heian Shrine, and Hōnen-in. 

In the northern parts are Kuramadera, Kifunejinja, Sanzen-in, the ruins of a house where Iwakura Tomomi was imprisoned, the Shugakuin Imperial Villa and Manshuin Temple, and the Kyoto International Conference Hall where the Kyoto Protocol was adopted. 

Sakyō-ku also contains the Kyoto Botanical Garden and several of the mountains lit up during the yearly Gozan no Okuribi festival, including the main Daimonji-yama.

The South Korean government maintains the Korea Education Institution in Sakyō-ku.

Education
The ward contains 23 elementary schools (of which 3 are private), 7 public middle schools, and 7 public high schools. It also has 5 private schools that are both middle and high schools.  

Several universities are located in the ward, including the prominent Kyoto University.  

Kyoto University
Kyoto Institute of Technology
Kyoto Prefectural University
Kyoto Seika University
Kyoto University of the Arts
Kyoto Notre Dame University
Kyoto College of Graduate Studies for Informatics

The Kyoto Korean Junior High-High School, a North Korean school, is in the ward.

References

External links

The ward's official homepage 
Government of Japan Ministry of the Environment article on Kyoto Protocol
Pool of photographs taken in Sakyo-ku on Flickr (retrieved March 9, 2010)

Wards of Kyoto